Ralph Gamble may refer to:

 Ralph A. Gamble (1885–1959), Republican member of the United States House of Representatives from New York
 Ralph Dominic Gamble (1897–1918), British Army officer